Dimitrios Bitsakos (born 23 May 1972) is a Greek former water polo player who competed in the 1992 Summer Olympics.

References

1972 births
Living people
Greek male water polo players
Olympic water polo players of Greece
Panathinaikos Water Polo Club players
Water polo players at the 1992 Summer Olympics
Water polo players from Patras